Shock Orchestra is a Serbian band formed as a supporting act for a Serbian rapper Marčelo's live concerts in 2006. They had their debut performance on April 15, 2006, in Dom Omladine in Belgrade, following a tour promoting Marčelo's second album Puzzle Shock!.
 
In September 2008. they finished recording Marčelo's third album "Treća Strana Medalje" (The Third Side Of The Medal), which was released in December 2008. Some of the musicians who played on the album include Wikluh Sky, Dragoljub Marković alias Dr. Dra (ex-member of rock-bands such as Ništa ali logopedi, Block Out, X-Centar), Ministar Lingvista (Real Skllz), Aleksandar Andrić (ex Kal) and Marko Milivojević (Ekatarina Velika, Morbidi, U Škripcu, Partibrejkers, Električni Orgazam, Old Stars Band etc.).

Serbian hip hop groups